Murrow may refer to

Edward R. Murrow (1908-1965), an American radio and television journalist
Murrow (film), a 1986 made-for-TV biopic about the journalist
Murrow, Cambridgeshire
Murrow East railway station
Murrow West railway station